The English Electric Lightning is a British fighter aircraft that served as an interceptor during the 1960s, the 1970s and into the late 1980s. It was capable of a top speed of above Mach 2. The Lightning was designed, developed, and manufactured by English Electric, which was later merged into the newly-formed British Aircraft Corporation. Later the type was marketed as the BAC Lightning.  It was operated by the Royal Air Force (RAF), the Kuwait Air Force (KAF), and the Royal Saudi Air Force (RSAF).

A unique feature of the Lightning's design is the vertical, staggered configuration of its two Rolls-Royce Avon turbojet engines within the fuselage. The Lightning was designed and developed as an interceptor to defend the V bomber airfields from attack by anticipated future nuclear-armed supersonic Soviet bombers such as what emerged as the Tupolev Tu-22, but it was subsequently also required to intercept other bomber aircraft such as the Tupolev Tu-16 and the Tupolev Tu-95.

The Lightning has exceptional rate of climb, ceiling, and speed; pilots have described flying it as "being saddled to a skyrocket". This performance and the initially limited fuel supply meant that its missions are dictated to a high degree by its limited range. Later developments provided greater range and speed along with aerial reconnaissance and ground-attack capability. Overwing fuel tank fittings were installed in the F6 variant and offered an extended range, but the maximum speed of the configuration was limited to a reported .

Following retirement by the RAF in the late 1980s, many of the remaining aircraft became museum exhibits. Until 2009, three Lightnings were kept flying at "Thunder City" in Cape Town, South Africa. In September 2008, the Institution of Mechanical Engineers conferred on the Lightning its "Engineering Heritage Award" at a ceremony at BAE Systems' site at Warton Aerodrome.

Development

Origins

The specification for the aircraft followed the cancellation of the Air Ministry's 1942 E.24/43 supersonic research aircraft specification which had resulted in the Miles M.52 programme. W.E.W. "Teddy" Petter, formerly chief designer at Westland Aircraft, was a keen early proponent of Britain's need to develop a supersonic fighter aircraft.

Petter initiated a design proposal with F W "Freddie" Page leading the design and Ray Creasey responsible for the aerodynamics. By July 1948 their proposal incorporated the stacked engine configuration and a high-mounted tailplane. As it was designed for Mach 1.5, it had a 40° swept wing to keep the leading edge clear of the Mach cone. This proposal was submitted in November 1948, and in January 1949 the project was designated P.1 by English Electric. On 29 March 1949 MoS granted approval to start the detailed design, develop wind tunnel models and build a full-size mockup.

The design that had developed during 1948 evolved further during 1949 to further improve performance. To achieve Mach 2 the wing sweep was increased to 60° with the ailerons moved to the wingtips. In late 1949, low-speed wind tunnel tests showed that a vortex was generated by the wing which caused a large downwash on the tailplane; this issue was solved by lowering the tail below the wing. Following the resignation of Petter, Page took over as design team leader for the P.1. In 1949, the Ministry of Supply had issued Specification F23/49, which expanded upon the scope of ER103 to include fighter-level manoeuvring. On 1 April 1950, English Electric received a contract for two flying airframes, as well as one static airframe, designated P.1.

The Royal Aircraft Establishment disagreed with Petter's choice of sweep angle (60 degrees) and tailplane position (low) considering it to be dangerous. To assess the effects of wing sweep and tailplane position on the stability and control of Petter's design Short Brothers were issued a contract, by the Ministry of Supply, to produce the Short SB.5 in mid-1950. This was a low-speed research aircraft that could test sweep angles from 50 to 69 degrees and tailplane positions high or low. Testing with the wings and tail set to the P.1 configuration started in January 1954 and confirmed this combination as the correct one.

Prototypes

From 1953 onward, the first three prototype aircraft were hand-built at Samlesbury Aerodrome, where all Lightnings were built. These aircraft had been assigned the aircraft serials WG760, WG763, and WG765 (the structural test airframe). The prototypes were powered by un-reheated Armstrong Siddeley Sapphire turbojets, as the selected Rolls-Royce Avon engines had fallen behind schedule due to their own development problems. Since there was no space in the fuselage for fuel the thin wings were the fuel tanks and since they also provided space for the stowed main undercarriage the fuel capacity was relatively small, giving the prototypes an extremely limited endurance, and the narrow tyres housed in the thin wings rapidly wore out if there was any crosswind component during take-off or landing. Outwardly, the prototypes looked very much like the production series, but they were distinguished by the rounded-triangular air intake with no centre-body at the nose, short fin, and lack of operational equipment.

On 9 June 1952, it was decided that there would be a second phase of prototypes built to develop the aircraft toward achieving ; these were designated P.1B while the initial three prototypes were retroactively reclassified as P.1A. P.1B was a significant improvement on P.1A. While it was similar in aerodynamics, structure and control systems, it incorporated extensive alterations to the forward fuselage, reheated Rolls-Royce Avon R24R engines, a conical centre body inlet cone, variable nozzle reheat and provision for weapons systems integrated with the ADC and AI.23 radar. Three P.1B prototypes were built, assigned serials XA847, XA853 and XA856.

In May 1954, WG760 and its support equipment were moved to RAF Boscombe Down for pre-flight ground taxi trials; on the morning of 4 August 1954, WG760, piloted by Roland Beamont, flew for the first time from Boscombe Down. One week later, WG760 officially achieved supersonic flight for the first time, having exceeded the speed of sound during its third flight. The occurrence was noticed during flight data analysis a few days later. While WG760 had proven the P.1 design to be viable, it was limited to  due to directional stability limits. In May 1956, the P.1 received the "Lightning" name, which was said to have been partially selected to reflect the aircraft's supersonic capabilities.

OR.155 and project selection
In 1955, the Air Ministry learned of the Tupolev Tu-22, expected to enter service in 1962. It could cruise for relatively long periods at Mach 1.2 and had a dash speed of Mach 1.5. Against a target flying at these speeds, the existing Gloster Javelin interceptors would be useless; its primary de Havilland Firestreak armament could only attack from the rear and the Tu-22 would run away from the Javelin in that approach. A faster version, the "thin-wing Javelin", would offer limited supersonic performance and make it marginally useful against the Tu-22, while a new missile, "Red Dean" would allow head-on attacks. This combination would be somewhat useful against Tu-22, but of marginal use if faster bombers were introduced. In January 1955, the Air Ministry issued Operational Requirement F.155 calling for a faster design to be armed with either an improved Firestreak known as "Blue Vesta", or an improved Red Dean known as "Red Hebe". The thin-wing Javelin was cancelled in May 1956.

In March 1957, Duncan Sandys released the 1957 Defence White Paper which outlined the changing strategic environment due to the introduction of ballistic missiles with nuclear warheads. Although missiles of the era had relatively low accuracy compared to a manned bomber, any loss of effectiveness could be addressed by the ever-increasing yield of the warhead. This suggested that there was no targeting of the UK that could not be carried out by missiles, and Sandys felt it was unlikely that the Soviets would use bombers as their primary method of attack beyond the mid-to-late 1960s.

This left only a brief period, from 1957 to some time in the 1960s, in which bombers remained a threat. Sandys felt that the imminent introduction of the Bloodhound Mk. II surface-to-air missile would offer enough protection against bombers. The Air Ministry disagreed; they pointed out that the Tu-22 would enter service before Bloodhound II, leaving the UK open to sneak attack. Sandys eventually agreed this was a problem, but pointed out that F.155 would enter service after Bloodhound, as would a further improved SAM, "Blue Envoy". F.155 was cancelled on 29 March 1957 and Blue Envoy in April.

To fill the immediate need for a supersonic interceptor, Lightning was selected for production. The aircraft was already flying, and the improved P.1B was only weeks away from its first flight. Lightnings mounting Firestreak could be operational years before Bloodhound II, and the aircraft's speed would make it a potent threat against the Tu-22 even in a tail-chase. To further improve its capability, in July 1957 the Blue Vesta program was reactivated in a slightly simplified form, allowing head-on attacks against an aircraft whose fuselage was heated through skin friction while flying supersonically. In November 1957, the missile was renamed "Red Top". This would allow Lightning to attack even faster bombers through a collision-course approach. Thus, what had originally been an aircraft without a mission beyond testing was now selected as the UK's next front-line fighter.

Further testing
On 4 April 1957 Beamont made the first flight of the P.1B XA847, exceeding Mach 1 during this flight. During the early flight trials of the P.1B speeds in excess of 1,000 mph were achieved daily. During this period the Fairey Delta 2 (FD2) held the world speed record of  achieved on 10 March 1956 and held till December 1957. While the P.1B was potentially faster than the FD2, it lacked the fuel capacity to provide one run in each direction at maximum speed to claim the record in accordance with international rules.

In 1958 two test pilots from the USAF Air Force Flight Test Center, Andy Anderson and Deke Slayton, were given the opportunity to familiarise themselves with the P.1B. Slayton, who was subsequently selected as one of the Mercury astronauts, commented:

In late October 1958, the plane was officially and formally named "Lightning". The event was celebrated in traditional style in a hangar at Royal Aircraft Establishment (RAE) Farnborough, with the prototype XA847 having the name 'Lightning' freshly painted on the nose in front of the RAF Roundel, which almost covered it. A bottle of champagne was put beside the nose on a special smashing rig which allowed the bottle to safely be smashed against the side of the aircraft. The honor of smashing the bottle went to the Chief of the Air Staff, Sir Dermot Boyle.

On 25 November 1958 the P.1B XA847, piloted by Roland Beamont, reached Mach 2 for the first time, the first time in a British aircraft. This made it the second Western European aircraft to reach Mach 2, the first one being the French Dassault Mirage III just over a month earlier on 24 October 1958.

Production
The first operational Lightning, designated Lightning F.1, was designed as an interceptor to defend the V Force airfields in conjunction with the "last ditch" Bristol Bloodhound missiles located either at the bomber airfield, e.g. at RAF Marham, or at dedicated missile sites near to the airfield, e.g. at RAF Woodhall Spa near the 3-squadron Vulcan station RAF Coningsby. The bomber airfields along with the dispersal airfields, would be the highest priority targets in the UK for enemy nuclear weapons. It was equipped with two 30 mm ADEN cannon in front of the cockpit windscreen and an interchangeable fuselage weapons pack containing either an additional two ADEN cannon, 48  unguided air-to-air rockets, or two de Havilland Firestreak air-to-air missiles. The Ferranti AI.23 onboard radar provided missile guidance and ranging, as well as search and track functions.

The next two Lightning variants, the Lightning F.1A and F.2, incorporated relatively minor design changes; for the next variant, the Lightning F.3, they were more extensive. The A.I.23B radar and Red Top missile offered a forward hemisphere attack capability and deletion of the nose cannon. The new engines and fin made the F.3 the highest performance Lightning yet, but with an even higher fuel consumption and resulting shorter range. The next variant, the Lightning F.6, was already in development, but there was a need for an interim solution to partially address the F.3's shortcomings, the Interim F.Mk6.

The conically cambered wing improved manoeuvrability, especially at higher altitudes, and the ventral tank nearly doubled available fuel. The increased fuel was welcome, but the lack of cannon armament was felt to be a deficiency. It was thought that cannon would be useful in a peacetime interception for firing warning shots to encourage an aircraft to change course or to land.

The Lightning F.6 was originally nearly identical to the F.3A with the exception that it could carry two  ferry tanks on pylons over the wings. These tanks were jettisonable in an emergency, and gave the F.6 a substantially improved deployment capability. There remained one glaring shortcoming: the lack of cannon. This was finally rectified in the form of a modified ventral tank with two ADEN cannon mounted in the front.

The Lightning F.2A was an F.2 upgraded with the cambered wing, the squared fin, and the  ventral tank. The F.2A retained the A.I.23 and Firestreak missile, the nose cannon, and the earlier Avon 211R engines. Although the F.2A lacked the thrust of the later Lightnings, it had the longest tactical range of all Lightning variants, and was used for low-altitude interception over West Germany.

Export and further developments
The Lightning F.53, otherwise known as the Export Lightning, was developed as a private venture by BAC. While the Lightning had originated as an interception aircraft, this version was to have a multirole capability for quickly interchanging between interception, reconnaissance, and ground-attack duties. The F.53 was based on the F.6 airframe and avionics, including the large ventral fuel tank, cambered wing and overwing pylons for drop tanks of the F.6, but incorporated an additional pair of hardpoints under the outer wing. These hardpoints could be fitted with pylons for air-to-ground weaponry, including two  bombs or four SNEB rocket pods each carrying 18 68 mm rockets. A gun pack carrying two ADEN cannons and 120 rounds each could replace the forward part of the ventral fuel tank. Alternative, interchangeable packs in the forward fuselage carried two Firestreak missiles, two Red Top missiles, twin retractable launchers for 44×  rockets, or a reconnaissance pod fitted with five 70 mm Type 360 Vinten cameras.

This could give a maximum ground attack weapons load for a developed export Lightning of six 1000 lb (450 kg) bombs or 44 ×  rockets and 144 × 68 mm rockets. The Lightning T.55 was the export two-seat variant; unlike the RAF two-seaters, the T.55 was equipped for combat duties. The T.55 had a very similar fuselage to the T.5, while also using the wing and large ventral tank of the F.6. The Export Lightning had all of the capability of the RAF's own Lightnings such as exceptional climb rate and agile manoeuvering. The Export Lightning also retained the difficulty of maintenance, and serviceability rates suffered. The F.53 was generally well regarded by its pilots, and its adaptation to multiple roles showed the skill of its designers.

In 1963, BAC Warton was working on the preliminary design of a two-seat Lightning development with a variable-geometry wing, based on the Lightning T.5. In addition to the variable-sweep wing, which was to sweepback between 25 degrees and 60 degrees, the proposed design featured an extended ventral pack for greater fuel capacity, an enlarged dorsal fin fairing, an arrestor hook, and a revised inward-retracting undercarriage. The aircraft was designed to be compatible with the Royal Navy's existing aircraft carriers' carrier-based aircraft, the VG Lightning concept was revised into a land-based interceptor intended for the RAF the following year. Various alternative engines to the Avon were suggested, such as the newer Rolls-Royce Spey engine. It is likely that the VG Lightning would have adopted a solid nose (by moving the air inlet to the sides or to upper fuselage) to install a larger, more capable radar.

Design

Overview
The Lightning had several distinctive design features, the primary being the twin-engine arrangement, notched delta wing, and low-mounted tailplane. The vertically stacked and longitudinally staggered engines were the solution devised by Petter to meet the conflicting requirements of minimising frontal area, providing undisturbed engine airflow across a wide speed range, and packaging two engines to provide sufficient thrust to meet performance goals. The unusual over/under configuration allowed for the thrust of two engines, with the drag equivalent to only 1.5 engines mounted side-by-side, a reduction in drag of 25% over more conventional twin-engine installations. The engines were fed by a single nose inlet (with inlet cone), with the flow split vertically aft of the cockpit, and the nozzles tightly stacked, effectively tucking one engine behind the cockpit. The result was a low frontal area, an efficient inlet, and excellent single-engine handling with no problems of asymmetrical thrust. Because the engines were close together, an uncontained failure of one engine was likely to damage the other. If desired, an engine could be shut down in flight and the remaining engine run at a more efficient power setting which increased range or endurance; although this was rarely done operationally because there would be no hydraulic power if the remaining engine failed.

Production aircraft were powered by various models of the Avon engine. Later models of the Avon featured, in addition to increased thrust, a full-variable reheat arrangement. Under optimum conditions, a well-equipped maintenance facility took four hours to perform an engine change so specialised ground test rigs were developed to speed up maintenance and remove the need to perform a full ground run of the engine after some maintenance tasks. The stacked engine configuration complicated maintenance work, and the leakage of fluid from the upper engine was a recurring fire hazard. The fire risk was reduced, but not eliminated, following remedial work during development. For removal, the lower No.1 engine was removed from below the aircraft, after removal of the ventral tank and lower fuselage access panels, by lowering the engine down, while the upper No.2 engine was lifted out from above via removable sections in the fuselage top.

The fuselage was tightly packed, leaving no room for fuel tankage or main landing gear. The main landing gear was sandwiched outboard of the main tanks and aft of the leading edge tanks, with the flap fuel tanks behind. On landing the No. 1 engine was usually shut down when taxiing to save brake wear, as keeping both engines running at idle power was still sufficient to propel the Lightning to 80 mph if brakes were not used. Dunlop Maxaret anti-skid brakes were fitted.

The Lightning fuel capacity was increased with a conformal ventral fuel tank. Fuel for the rocket would come from the aircraft fuel supply. The rocket engine option was cancelled in 1958 when it was established that performance with afterburning Avon engines was acceptable. The ventral store was routinely used as an extra fuel tank, holding  of usable fuel. On later variants of the Lightning, a ventral weapons pack could be installed to equip the aircraft alternatively with different armaments, including missiles, rockets, and cannons.

Avionics and systems

Early versions of the Lightning were equipped with the Ferranti-developed AI.23 monopulse radar, which was contained right at the front of the fuselage within an inlet cone at the centre of the engine intake. Radar information was displayed on an early head-up display and managed by onboard computers. The AI.23 supported several operational modes, which included autonomous search, automatic target tracking, and ranging for all weapons; the pilot attack sight provided gyroscopically-derived lead angle and backup stadiametric ranging for gun firing. The radar and gunsight were collectively designated the AIRPASS, for "Airborne Interception Radar and Pilot Attack Sight System". The radar was successively upgraded with the introduction of more capable Lightning variants, such as to provide guidance for the Red Top missile.

The cockpit of the Lightning was designed to meet the RAF's OR946 specification for tactical air navigation technology, and thus featured an integrated flight instrument display arrangement, an Elliott Bros (London) Ltd auto-pilot, a master reference gyroscopic reader, an auto-attack system, and an instrument landing system. Despite initial scepticism of the aircraft's centralised detection and warning system, the system proved its merits during the development program and was redeveloped for greater reliability. Communications included UHF and VHF radios and a datalink. Unlike the previous generation of aircraft which used gaseous oxygen for lifesupport, the Lightning employed liquid oxygen-based apparatus for the pilot; cockpit pressurisation and conditioning was maintained through tappings from the engine compressors.

Electricity was provided via a bleed air-driven turbine housed in the rear fuselage, which drove an AC alternator and DC generator. This approach was unusual, since most aircraft used driveshaft-driven generators/alternators for electrical energy. A 28V DC battery provided emergency backup power. Aviation author Kev Darling stated of the Lightning: "Never before had a fighter been so dependent upon electronics". Each engine was equipped with a pair of hydraulic pumps, one of which powered the flight-control systems and the other power for the undercarriage, flaps, and airbrakes. Switchable hydraulic circuits were used for redundancy in the event of a leak or other failure. A combination of Dunlop Maxaret anti-skid brakes on the main wheels and an Irvin Air Chute braking parachute slowed the aircraft during landing. A tailhook was also fitted. Accumulators on the wheel brakes performed as backups to the hydraulics, providing minimal braking. Above a certain airspeed a stopped engine would 'windmill', that is, continue to be rotated by air flowing through it in a similar manner to a ram air turbine, sufficient to generate adequate hydraulic power for the powered controls during flight.

Toward the end of its service, the Lightning was increasingly outclassed by newer fighters, mainly due to avionics and armament obsolescence. The radar had a limited range and no track while scanning capability, and it could detect targets only in a narrow (40°) arc. While an automatic collision course attack system was developed and successfully demonstrated by English Electric, it was not adopted due to cost concerns. Plans were mooted to supplement or replace the obsolete Red Top and Firestreak missiles with modern AIM-9L Sidewinder missiles to help rectify some of the obsolescence, but these ambitions were not realised due to lack of funding. An alternative to the modernisation of existing aircraft would have been the development of more advanced variants; a proposed variable-sweep wing Lightning would have likely involved the adoption of a new powerplant and radar and was believed by BAC to significantly increase performance, but ultimately was not pursued.

Climb performance
Lightning, was designed...as an intercepter fighter. As such, it has probably the fastest rate-of-climb of any combat aircraft – Flight International, 21 March 1968
The Lightning possessed a remarkable climb rate. It was famous for its ability to rapidly rotate from takeoff to climb almost vertically from the runway, though this did not yield the best time-to-altitude. The Lightning's trademark tail-stand manoeuvre exchanged airspeed for altitude; it could slow to near-stall speeds before commencing level flight. The Lightning's optimum climb profile required the use of afterburners during takeoff. Around  the Lightning would reach  and maintain this speed until reaching the tropopause,  on a standard day. If climbing further, pilots would accelerate to supersonic speed at the tropopause before resuming the climb. A Lightning flying at optimum climb profile would reach  in under three minutes.

The official ceiling of the Lightning was kept secret. Climb techniques and flight profiles were developed to put the Lightning into a suitable attack position. For the intercepts, four Lightning F1As conducted 18 solo sorties. Due to sensitivity, details of these flights were deliberately avoided in the pilot log books.

In 1984, during a NATO exercise, Flt Lt Mike Hale intercepted a U-2 at a height which they had previously considered safe (thought to be ). This was not sustained level flight but a ballistic climb, in which the pilot takes the aircraft to top speed and then puts the aircraft into a climb, exchanging speed for altitude. Hale also participated in time-to-height and acceleration trials against Lockheed F-104 Starfighters from Aalborg. He reports that the Lightnings won all races easily with the exception of the low-level supersonic acceleration, which was a "dead heat".

Carroll compared the Lightning and the F-15C Eagle, having flown both aircraft, stating that: "Acceleration in both was impressive, you have all seen the Lightning leap away once brakes are released, the Eagle was almost as good, and climb speed was rapidly achieved. The Lightning was quicker off the ground, reaching  height in a horizontal distance of ". Chief test pilot for the Lightning Roland Beamont, who also flew most of the "Century Series" US aircraft, stated his opinion that nothing at that time had the inherent stability, control, and docile handling characteristics of the Lightning throughout the full flight envelope. The turn performance and buffet boundaries of the Lightning were well in advance of anything known to him.

Aircraft performance
Directional stability decreased as speed increased, with vertical fin failure likely if yaw was not correctly counteracted with rudder deflections. Imposed Mach limits during missile launches ensured adequate directional stability; later Lightning variants had a larger vertical fin, giving a greater stability margin at high speed.

It was not known whether the fixed centre-body intake, with a design point of Mach 1.7, would encounter intake buzz, a vibration caused by oscillation of the shock positions at different combinations of Mach number and engine air flow/rpm. A Lightning prototype was taken to Mach 2.0 to check for this instability but none was found. Service trials with the F.6 found intake buzz when engine speed was rapidly reduced at speeds above Mach 1.85 as well as when manoeuvring (increased 'g') at other supersonic speeds and engine thrust settings. The buzz caused no damage.

Thermal and structural limits were also present. Air is heated considerably when compressed by the passage of an aircraft at supersonic speeds. The airframe absorbs heat from the surrounding air, the inlet shock cone at the front of the aircraft becoming the hottest part. The shock cone was fibreglass, necessary because the shock cone also served as a radar radome; a metal shock cone would have blocked the AI 23's radar emissions. The shock cone was eventually weakened due to the fatigue caused by the thermal cycles involved in regularly performing high-speed flights. The shock cone was strengthened on the later Lightning F.2A, F.3, F.6, and F.53 models, thus allowing routine operation at up to Mach 2.0.

The small-fin variants could exceed Mach 1.7, but the stability limits and shock cone thermal and strength limits made such speeds risky. The large-fin variants, especially those equipped with Avon 300-series engines could safely reach Mach 2 and, given the right atmospheric conditions, might even achieve a few more tenths of a Mach. With the strengthened shock cone, the Lightning could safely approach its thrust limit, but fuel consumption at very high airspeeds was excessive and became a major limiting factor.

Handling characteristics
The Lightning was fully aerobatic.

Operational history

Royal Air Force

The first aircraft to enter service with the RAF, three pre-production P.1Bs, arrived at RAF Coltishall in Norfolk on 23 December 1959, joining the Air Fighting Development Squadron (AFDS) of the Central Fighter Establishment, where they were used to clear the Lightning for entry into service. The production Lightning F.1 entered service with the AFDS in May 1960, allowing the unit to take part in the air defence exercise "Yeoman" later that month. The Lightning F.1 entered frontline squadron service with 74 Squadron under the command of Squadron Leader John "Johnny" Howe at Coltishall from 11 July 1960. This made the Lightning the second Western European-built combat aircraft with true supersonic capability to enter service and the second fully supersonic aircraft to be deployed in Western Europe, the first one in both categories being the Swedish Saab 35 Draken on 8 March 1960 four months earlier.

The aircraft's radar and missiles proved to be effective and pilots reported that the Lightning was easy to fly. However, in the first few months of operation the aircraft's serviceability was extremely poor. This was due to the complexity of the aircraft systems and shortages of spares and ground support equipment. Even when the Lightning was not grounded by technical faults, the RAF initially struggled to get more than 20 flying hours per aircraft per month compared with the 40 flying hours that English Electric believed could be achieved with proper support. In spite of these concerns, within six months of the Lightning entering service, 74 Squadron was able to achieve 100 flying hours per aircraft.

In addition to its training and operational roles, 74 Squadron was appointed as the official Fighter Command aerobatic team for 1961, flying at air shows throughout the United Kingdom and Europe. Deliveries of the slightly improved Lightning F.1A, with improved avionics and provision for an air-to-air refuelling probe, allowed two more squadrons, 56 and 111 Squadron, both based at RAF Wattisham to convert to the Lightning in 1960–1961. The Lightning F.1 would only be ordered in limited numbers and serve for a short time; nonetheless, it was viewed as a significant step forward in Britain's air defence capabilities. Following their replacement from frontline duties by the introduction of successively improved variants of the Lightning, the remaining F.1 aircraft were employed by the Lightning Conversion Squadron.

An improved variant, the F.2 first flew on 11 July 1961 and entered service with 19 Squadron at the end of 1962 and 92 Squadron in early 1963. Conversion of these two squadrons was aided by the use of the two seat T.4 trainer, which entered service with the Lightning Conversion Squadron (later renamed 226 Operational Conversion Unit) in June 1962. While the OCU was the major user of the two seater, small numbers were also allocated to the front-line fighter squadrons. More F.2s were produced than there were available squadron slots so later production aircraft were stored for years before being used operationally; some Lightning F.2s were converted to F.2a's. They had some of the improvements added to the F.6.

The F.3, with more powerful engines and the new Red Top missile (but no cannon) was expected to be the definitive Lightning, and at one time it was planned to equip ten squadrons, with the remaining two squadrons retaining the F.2. On 16 June 1962, the F.3 flew for the first time. It had a short operational life and was withdrawn from service early due to defence cutbacks and the introduction of the F.6, some of which were converted F.3s.

The Lightning F.6 was a more capable and longer-range version of the F.3. It initially had no cannon, but installable gun packs were made available later. A few F.3s were upgraded to F.6s. Author Kev Darling suggests that decreasing British overseas defence commitments had led to those aircraft instead being prematurely withdrawn. The introduction of the F.3 and F.6 allowed the RAF to progressively reequip squadrons operating aircraft such as the Gloster Javelin and retire these types during the mid-1960s.

A Lightning was tasked with shooting down a pilot-less Harrier over West Germany in 1972. The pilot had abandoned the Harrier which continued flying toward the East German border. It was shot down to avoid a diplomatic incident. During British Airways trials in April 1985, Concorde was offered as a target to NATO fighters including F-15 Eagles, F-16 Fighting Falcons, F-14 Tomcats, Mirages, and F-104 Starfighters – but only Lightning XR749, flown by Mike Hale and described by him as "a very hot ship, even for a Lightning", managed to overtake Concorde on a stern conversion intercept.

During the 1960s, as strategic awareness increased and a multitude of alternative fighter designs were developed by Warsaw Pact and NATO members, the Lightning's range and firepower shortcomings became increasingly apparent. The transfer of McDonnell Douglas F-4 Phantom IIs from Royal Navy service enabled these much longer-ranged aircraft to be added to the RAF's interceptor force alongside those withdrawn from Germany as they were replaced by SEPECAT Jaguars in the ground attack role. The Lightning's direct replacement was the Tornado F3, an interceptor variant of the Panavia Tornado. The Tornado featured several advantages over the Lightning, including a far larger weapons load and considerably more advanced avionics. Lightnings were slowly phased out of service between 1974 and 1988. In their final years the airframes required considerable maintenance to keep them airworthy due to the sheer number of accumulated flight hours.

Fighter Command and Strike Command
The main Lightning role was the air defence of the United Kingdom and was operated at first as part of Fighter Command and then from 1968 with No. 11 Group of Strike Command. At the formation of Strike Command nine Lightning squadrons were operational in the United Kingdom.

Far East Air Force
In 1967 No. 74 Squadron was moved to RAF Tengah, Singapore to take over the air defence role from the Gloster Javelin equipped 60 Squadron. The squadron was disbanded in 1971 following the withdrawal of British forces from Singapore.

Near East Air Force
The Royal Air Force had detached Lightnings to RAF Akrotiri, Cyprus to support the Near East Air Force and in 1967 No. 56 Squadron RAF moved from RAF Wattisham with the Lightning F.3 to provide a permanent air defence force, it converted to the F.6 in 1971 and returned to the United Kingdom in 1975.

Royal Air Force Germany
In the early 1960s No. 19 Squadron and No. 92 Squadron with Lightning F.2s, moved from RAF Leconfield to RAF Gütersloh in West Germany as part of Royal Air Force Germany and operated in the low-level air defence role until disbanded in 1977 when the role was taken over by the Phantom FGR2.

Saudi Arabia and Kuwait

On 21 December 1965, Saudi Arabia, keen to improve its air defences owing to the Saudi involvement in the North Yemen Civil War and the resultant air incursions into Saudi airspace by Egyptian forces supporting the Yemeni Republicans, placed a series of orders with Britain and the US to build a new integrated air defence system. BAC received orders for 34 multirole single-seat Lightning F.53s that could still retain very high performance and reasonable endurance, and six two-seat T.55 trainers, together with 25 BAC Strikemaster trainers, while the contract also included new radar systems, American HAWK surface-to-air missiles and training and support services.

To provide an urgent counter to air incursions, with Saudi towns near the border being bombed by Egyptian aircraft, an additional interim contract, called "Magic Carpet", was placed in March 1966 for the supply of six ex-RAF Lightnings (four F.2s and two T.4 trainers, redesignated F.52 and T.54 respectively), six Hawker Hunters, two air defence radars and a number of Thunderbird surface-to-air missiles. The "Magic Carpet" Lightnings were delivered to Saudi Arabia in July 1966. One lost in an accident was later replaced (May 1967). The Lightnings and Hunters, flown by mercenary pilots, were deployed to Khamis Mushait airfield near the Yemeni border, resulting in the curtailing of operations by the Egyptian Air Force over the Yemeni-Saudi border.
Afterwards during the Al-Wadiah War RSAF Lightnings flown by Saudi & Pakistani pilots participated in the airstrikes on Yemeni militias after they captured  a town in Saudi Arabia in 1969.

Kuwait ordered 14 Lightnings in December 1966, comprising 12 F.53Ks and two T.55Ks. The first Kuwait aircraft, a T.55K first flew on 24 May 1968 and deliveries to Kuwait started in December 1968. The Kuwaitis somewhat overestimated their ability to maintain such a complex aircraft, not adopting the extensive support from BAC and Airwork Services that the Saudis used to keep their Lightnings operational, so serviceability was poor.

Saudi Arabia officially received F.53 Lightnings in December 1967, although they were kept at Warton while trials and development continued and the first Saudi Lightnings to leave Warton were four T.55s delivered in early 1968 to the Royal Air Force 226 Operational Conversion Unit at RAF Coltishall, the four T.55s were used to train Saudi aircrew for the next 18 months. The new-build Lightnings were delivered under Operation "Magic Palm" between July 1968 and August 1969. Two Lightnings, a F.53 and a T.55 were destroyed in accidents prior to delivery, and were replaced by two additional aircraft, the last of which was delivered in June 1972. The multirole F.53s served in the ground-attack and reconnaissance roles as well as an air defence fighter, with Lightnings of No 6 Squadron RSAF carrying out ground-attack missions using rockets and bombs during a border dispute with South Yemen between December 1969 and May 1970. One F.53 (53–697) was shot down by Yemeni ground fire on 3 May 1970 during a reconnaissance mission, with the pilot ejecting successfully and being rescued by Saudi forces. Saudi Arabia received Northrop F-5E fighters from 1971, which resulted in the Lightnings relinquishing the ground-attack mission, concentrating on air defence, and to a lesser extent, reconnaissance.

Kuwait's Lightnings did not have a long service career. After an unsuccessful attempt by the regime to sell them to Egypt in 1973, the last Lightnings were replaced with Dassault Mirage F1s in 1977. The remaining aircraft were stored at Kuwait International Airport, many were destroyed during the Invasion of Kuwait by Iraq (August 1990).

Until 1982, Saudi Arabia's Lightnings were mainly operated by 2 and 6 Squadron RSAF (although a few were also used by 13 Squadron RSAF), but when 6 Squadron re-equipped with the F-15 Eagle then all the remaining aircraft were operated by 2 Squadron at Tabuk. In 1985 as part of the agreement to sell the Panavia Tornado to the RSAF, the 22 flyable Lightnings were traded in to British Aerospace and returned to Warton in January 1986. While BAe offered the ex-Saudi Lightnings to Austria and Nigeria, no sales were made, and the aircraft were eventually disposed of to museums.

Variants

English Electric P.1A
Single-seat supersonic research aircraft, two prototypes built and one static test airframe.

English Electric P.1B
Single-seat operational prototypes to meet Specification F23/49, three prototypes built, further 20 development aircraft ordered in February 1954. Type was officially named 'Lightning' in October 1958.

Lightning F.1
Development batch aircraft, single-seat fighters delivered from 1959, a total of 19 built (and one static test airframe). Nose-mounted twin 30 mm ADEN cannon, two Firestreak missiles, VHF Radio and Ferranti AI-23 "AIRPASS" radar.

Lightning F.1A
Single-seat fighter, delivered in 1961. Featured Avon 210R engines, an inflight refuelling probe and UHF Radio; a total of 28 built.

Lightning F.2
Single-seat fighter (an improved variant of the F.1), delivered in 1962. A total of 44 built with 31 later modified to F.2A standard, five later modified to F.52 for export to Saudi Arabia.

Lightning F.2A
Single-seat fighter (F.2s upgraded to near F.6 standard); featuring Avon 211R engines, retained ADEN cannon and Firestreak (replaceable Firestreak pack swappable with ADEN Cannon Pack for a total of four ADEN Cannon), arrestor hook and enlarged Ventral Tank for two hours flight endurance. A total of 31 converted from F.2.

Lightning F.3
Single-seat fighter with upgraded AI-23B radar, Avon 301R engines, new Red Top missiles, enlarged and clipped tailfin due to aerodynamics of carriage of Red Top, and deletion of ADEN cannon. A total of 70 built (at least nine were converted to F.6 standard).

Lightning F.3A
Single-seat fighter with extended range of 800 miles due to large ventral tank and new cambered wings. A total of 16 built, known also as an F.3 Interim version or F.6 Interim Version, 15 later modified to F.6 standard.

Lightning T.4
Two-seat side-by-side training version, based on the F.1A; two prototypes and 20 production built, two aircraft later converted to T.5 prototypes, two aircraft later converted to T.54.

Lightning T.5
Two-seat side-by-side training version, based on the F.3; 22 production aircraft built. One former RAF aircraft later converted to T.55 for Saudi Arabia.

Lightning F.6
Single-seat fighter (an improved longer-range variant of the F.3). It featured new wings with better efficiency and subsonic performance, overwing fuel tanks and a larger ventral fuel tank, reintroduction of 30 mm cannon (initially no cannon but later in the forward part of the ventral pack rather than in the nose), use of Red Top missiles. A total of 39 built (also nine converted from F.3 and 15 from F.3A).

Lightning F.7
Proposed single-seat interceptor featuring variable geometry wings, extended fuselage, relocated undercarriage, underwing hardpoints, cheek-mounted intakes, new radar, and use of the Sparrow and Skyflash AAMs. Never built.

Lightning F.52
Slightly modified ex-RAF F.2 single-seat fighters for export to Saudi Arabia (five converted).

Lightning F.53
Export version of the F.6 with pylons for bombs or unguided rocket pods, 44 × 2 in (50 mm), total of 46 built and one converted from F.6 (12 F.53Ks for the Kuwaiti Air Force, 34 F.53s for the Royal Saudi Arabian Air Force, one aircraft crashed before delivery).

Lightning T.54
Ex-RAF T.4 two-seat trainers supplied to Saudi Arabia (two converted).

Lightning T.55
Two-seat side-by-side training aircraft (export version of the T.5), eight built (six T.55s for the Royal Saudi Arabian Air Force, two T.55Ks for the Kuwaiti Air Force and one converted from T.5 that crashed before delivery).

Sea Lightning FAW.1
Proposed two-seat Royal Navy Fleet Air Arm carrier capable variant with variable-geometry wing; not built.

Operators

Military operators

 Kuwait Air Force operated both the F.53K (12) single-seat fighter and the T.55K (2) training version from 1968 to 1977.

Royal Saudi Air Force operated the Lightning from 1967 to 1986.
 2 Squadron operated the F.53 and T.55
 6 Squadron operated the F.52 and F.53
 13 Squadron operated the F.52, F.53 and T.55
 RSAF Lightning Conversion Unit

Royal Air Force operated the Lightning from 1959 to 1988.
 RAF Aerial display teams
 The Tigers of No 74 Squadron. Lead RAF aerial display team from 1962 and first display team with Mach 2 aircraft.
 The Firebirds of No 56 Squadron from 1963 in red and silver.
 RAF Squadrons
 5 Squadron formed at RAF Binbrook on 8 October 1965, operating the Lightning F.6 and T.5. A few F.1s, F.1As and F.3s were used as targets (and later for air display use) from 1971. The Squadron remained operational at Binbrook with the Lightning F.6 until 1987, disbanding on 31 December.
 11 Squadron formed at RAF Leuchars in April 1967 with the Lightning F.6. It moved to RAF Binbrook in March 1972, receiving a few F.3s for target duties. It remained operational until 1988, disbanding on 30 April 1988.
 19 Squadron operated the F.2 and the F.2A (1962–1976)
 23 Squadron operated the F.3 and the F.6 (1964–1975)
 29 Squadron operated the F.3 (1967–1974)
 56 Squadron operated the F.1, F.1A, F.3 and the F.6 (1960–1976)
 65 Squadron operated as No. 226 OCU with the F.1, F.1A and the F.3 (1971–1974)
 74 Squadron operated the F.1, F.3 and the F.6 (1960–1971)
 92 Squadron operated the F.2 and the F.2A (1963–1977)
 111 Squadron operated the F.1A, F.3 and the F.6 (1961–1974)
 145 Squadron operated as No. 226 OCU with the F.1, F.1A and the F.3 (1963–1971)
 226 Operational Conversion Unit operated the F.1A, F.3, T.4 and the T.5 (1963–1974)
 Air Fighting Development Squadron
 Lightning Conversion Squadron (1960–1963)
 RAF Flights
 Binbrook Target Facilities Flight (1966–1973)
 Leuchars Target Facilities Flight (1966–1973)
 Wattisham Target Facilities Flight (1966–1973)
 Lightning Training Flight (1975–1987)
 RAF Stations
 RAF Akrotiri
 RAF Binbrook
 RAF Coltishall
 RAF Geilenkirchen
 RAF Gütersloh
 RAF Leconfield
 RAF Middleton St. George
 RAF Leuchars
 RAF Tengah
 RAF Wattisham

Civil operators

Thunder City, a private company based at Cape Town International Airport, South Africa operated one Lightning T.5 and two single-seat F.6es. The T.5 XS452, (civil registration ZU-BBD) flew again on 14 January 2014 after restoration and is currently the only airworthy example.
A Lightning T.5, XS451 (civil registration ZU-BEX) belonging to Thunder City crashed after developing mechanical problems during its display at the biennial South African Air Force Overberg Airshow held at AFB Overberg near Bredasdorp on 14 November 2009. The Silver Falcons, the South African Air Force's official aerobatic team, flew a missing man formation after it was announced that the pilot had died in the crash.

British Aerospace operated four ex-RAF F.6s as radar targets to aid development of the Panavia Tornado ADV's AI.24 Foxhunter radar from 1988 to 1992.

The Anglo-American Lightning Organisation, a group based at Stennis Airport, Kiln, Mississippi, is returning EE Lightning T.5, XS422 to airworthy status. As of March 2021, the aircraft was capable of fast taxiing down a runway. The aircraft was formerly with the Empire Test Pilots' School (ETPS) at Boscombe Down in Wiltshire, UK.

Surviving aircraft

A complete list is available here.

Cyprus
On display
 XS929 Lightning F.6 at RAF Akrotiri, Cyprus.

France
On display
 XM178 Lightning F.1A at Savigny-les-Beaune.

Germany
On display
 XN782 Lightning F.2A at the Flugausstellung Hermeskeil, Germany.

Kuwait
On display
53–418 Lightning F.53 at the Kuwait Science and Natural History Museum, Kuwait City.
 Lightning F.53 at the Abdullah Al-Mubarak Air Base.
 Three Lightnings on stands at Al Jaber Air Base

Netherlands
On display
 XN784 Lightning F.2A owned by PS Aero in Holland, on display at their facility in Baarlo.

Saudi Arabia
On display
XN770 Lightning F.52 at the Royal Saudi Air Force Museum, Riyadh, Saudi Arabia.
XM989 Lightning T.54 at the main entrance to King Abdul-Aziz Air Base, Dhahran, Saudi Arabia.
55–716 Lightning T.55 at the Royal Saudi Air Force Museum, Riyadh, Saudi Arabia.
"227" Lightning Mark F.53 pylon-mounted on static display in a traffic circle outside the main gate of King Faisal Air Base in Tabuk, Saudi Arabia. GPS 28.387229, 36.594182
The following are on display but with no public access:
XG313 Lightning F.1 at the VIP terminal on King Abdulaziz Air Base Dhahran, Saudi Arabia.
XN767 Lightning F.52 pylon mounted at the Aeromedical centre on King Abdulaziz Air Base Dhahran, Saudi Arabia.
Unidentified Lightning at entrance to Taif Heart Mall in downtown Taif, Saudi Arabia.
"224" Lightning Mark F.53 on display at Royal Saudi Air Force, King Khalid Airbase in Khamis Mushyt, Saudi Arabia. GPS 18.260764, 42.795216  
Unidentified Lightning mounted in a static display on the Royal Saudi Air Force, King Khalid Airbase in Khamis Mushyt, Saudi Arabia. GPS 18.272086, 42.805935
Unidentified Lightning on display in a small air park just inside the main gate of King Faisal Air Base in Tabuk, Saudi Arabia. GPS 28.380036, 36.605270

South Africa
Stored or under restoration
ZU-BBD (former XS452) Lightning T.5 based at Cape Town under restoration to fly.
ZU-BEW (former XR773) Lightning F.6 stored in Cape Town under restoration to fly.
ZU-BEY (former XP693) Lightning F.6 stored in Cape Town under restoration to fly.

United Kingdom
On display
 WG760, the first prototype P.1A at the RAF Museum Cosford, England
 WG763, the second prototype P.1A at the Museum of Science and Industry, Manchester, England
 XG329 P1B/Lightning F.1 pre-production aircraft at the Norfolk & Suffolk Aviation Museum, Flixton, England
 XG337 P1B/Lightning F.1 pre-production aircraft at the RAF Museum Cosford
 XM135 Lightning F.1 at the Imperial War Museum Duxford – flown by non-pilot Walter Holden
 XM173 Lightning F.1A at Dyson Ltd. (on display in staff canteen), Malmesbury, Wiltshire.
 XM192 Lightning F.1A at Tattershall Thorpe, Lincolnshire, England
 XN726 Lightning F.2A cockpit section at the Boscombe Down Aviation Collection, Old Sarum Airfield, Wiltshire
 XN776 Lightning F.2A at the National Museum of Flight, East Fortune, Scotland
 XP706 Lightning F.3 at South Yorkshire Aircraft Museum, Doncaster, England
 XP745 Lightning F.3 at Vanguard Self Storage, Bristol, England
 XR713 Lightning F.3 owned by Lightning Preservation Group, Bruntingthorpe Aerodrome, Leicestershire
 XR718 Lightning F.3 owned by Anthony Harker, Over Dinsdale, Darlington, Durham.
 XR749 Lightning F.3 outside Score Group's Integrated Valve and Gas Turbine Plant, Peterhead, Scotland
 XS417 Lightning T.5 at the Newark Air Museum, Newark, England
 XS420 Lightning T.5 on loan to the Farnborough Air Sciences Trust, Farnborough, England
 XS456 Lightning T.5 at the Skegness Water Leisure Park, Lincolnshire
 XS458 Lightning T.5 is in taxiable condition at Cranfield Airport, Bedfordshire, England (taxi-able)
 XS459 Lightning T.5 at the Fenland and West Norfolk Aviation Museum, Wisbech, England
 XR753 Lightning F.6 at RAF Coningsby, Lincolnshire
 XR755 Lightning F.6 near Callington, Cornwall.
 XR728 Lightning F.6 with LPG, in taxiable condition at Bruntingthorpe Aerodrome, Leicestershire, England
XR770 Lightning F.6 at RAF Manston Museum, Kent, England
 XR771 Lightning F.6 at the Midland Air Museum, Coventry, England
 XS897 Lightning F.6 (painted as F.3 XP765) at RAF Coningsby, Lincolnshire
 XS903 Lightning F.6 at the Yorkshire Air Museum, Elvington, England
 XS904 Lightning F.6 with LPG, in taxiable Bruntingthorpe Aerodrome, Leicestershire, England
 XS919 Lightning F.6 at Henstridge Airfield, Somerset, England
 XS925 Lightning F.6 stand mounted at Castle Motors on the A38 near Liskeard, Cornwall, England
 XS928 Lightning F.6 at Warton Aerodrome, Lancashire
 XS936 Lightning F.6 at the Royal Air Force Museum London, England
 ZF578 Lightning F.53 as XR753 at the Tangmere Military Aviation Museum, Tangmere, England
 ZF579 Lightning F.53 in taxiable condition Gatwick Aviation Museum, Charlwood, near Gatwick Airport, England
 ZF580/XR768 Lightning F.53 in preserved condition at Cornwall Aviation Heritage Centre, Newquay Airport, Cornwall, England.
 ZF583 Lightning F.53 at the Solway Aviation Museum, Carlisle Airport Cumbria England
 ZF584 Lightning F.53 at the Dumfries and Galloway Aviation Museum, Dumfries, Scotland
 ZF588 Lightning F.53 at the East Midlands Aeropark, Castle Donington, Derbyshire
 ZF592 Lightning F.53 as 53–686 at the City of Norwich Aviation Museum, Norwich, England
 ZF594 Lightning F.53 painted as XS933 at the North East Aircraft Museum, Sunderland, England
 ZF598 Lightning T.55 as 55–713 at the Midland Air Museum, Coventry, England
 XL629 Lightning T.4 inside the main gate at MoD Boscombe Down, Wiltshire, England
Stored or under restoration
 XM172 Lightning F.1A in a private collection at Spark Bridge, Cumbria
 XS416 Lightning T.5 in a private collection at New York, Lincolnshire
 XR724 Lightning F.6 is in taxiable condition at the former RAF Binbrook, Lincolnshire
 XR725 Lightning F.6 in a private collection at Binbrook, Lincolnshire
 ZF581 Lightning F.53 Under restoration at the Bentwaters Cold War Museum, Suffolk, England

United States
On display
ZF593 Lightning F.53 painted in 5 Squadron camouflage colours, on display at Pima Air & Space Museum in Tucson, Arizona.
ZF597 Lightning T.55 painted in RAF markings, on display at Olympic Flight Museum in Olympia, Washington.

Stored or under restoration
XS422 Lightning T.5 painted in RAF markings, under restoration to fly at Stennis International Airport, in Hancock County, Mississippi. (owned by the Anglo-American Lightning Organisation who also own the cockpit of ZF595 which is being used as a parts donor for XS422).

Specifications (Lightning F.6)

Notable appearances

 The 1965 period comedy film Those Magnificent Men in Their Flying Machines set in 1910 ends with a flyover of six English Electric Lightnings.
 British journalist and TV presenter Jeremy Clarkson borrowed a Lightning (serial XM172) which was temporarily placed in his garden and documented on Clarkson's 2001 television series Speed.
 In a 2010 episode of the BBC TV programme Wonders of the Solar System, Professor Brian Cox had a South African Lightning (XS451) climb to a very high altitude, allowing Cox to show the curvature of the Earth and the relative dimensions of the atmosphere. This aircraft crashed in November 2009, a month after the episode was filmed, when it developed mechanical problems during an air show at South Africa's AFB Overberg.

See also

 Holden's Lightning flight – an inadvertent Lightning flight by a non-pilot engineer

Notes

References

Citations

Sources
 
 
 Beamont, Roland. Flying to the Limit. Somerset, UK: Patrick Stevens Ltd, 1996. .
 Bowman, Martin W. English Electric Lightning. Wiltshire, UK: The Crowood Press Ltd, 1997. .
 Buttler, Tony. British Secret Projects: Jet Fighters Since 1950. Hinckley, UK: Midland Publishing, 2005. .
 Buttler, Tony. X-Planes of Europe II: Military Prototype Aircraft from the Golden Age 1946–1974. Manchester, UK: Hikoki Publications, 2015. 
 Darling, Kev. English Electric/British Aircraft Corporation Lightning Mks 1–6. Lulu.com, 2008. .
 
 
 
 Dunn, Bob. Colourful Career: The Life and Times of a Lightning. Air Enthusiast 115, January–February 2005, pp. 18–19. 
 
 
 Gunston, Bill and Mike Spick. Modern Air Combat: Aircraft, Tactics and Weapons Employed in Aerial Warfare Today. London: Salamander Books, 1983. .
 Halpenny, Bruce Barrymore. English Electric/BAC Lightning. Oxford, UK: Osprey Air Combat, 1984. .
 Jackson, Paul. "Lament for the Lightning". Air International, Vol. 34, No. 6, June 1988, pp. 279–289, 307. .
 Lake, Jon. "Aircraft Profile – English Electric Lightning – Part One". Air International. Vol. 70, No. 1, January 2006, pp. 64–66. .
 Lake, Jon. "Aircraft Profile – English Electric Lightning – Part Two". Air International. Vol. 70, No. 2, February 2006, pp. 64–66. .
 Lake, Jon. "Aircraft Profile – English Electric Lightning – Part Three". Air International. Vol. 70, No. 3, March 2006, pp. 64–66. .
 Lake, Jon. "English Electric Lightning". Wings of Fame, Volume 7, 1997, pp. 36–101. . .
 Laming, Tim. Fight's On: Airborne with the Aggressors. Minneapolis, Minnesota: Zenith Imprint, 1996. .
 McLelland, Tim. English Electric Lightning: Britain's First and Last Supersonic Interceptor. Surrey, UK: Ian Allan Publishing, 2009. .
 "Multi-Mission Lightning". Flight International, 5 September 1968, pp. 371–378.
 The Illustrated Encyclopedia of Aircraft (Part Work 1982–1985). London: Orbis Publishing, 1985.
 Philpott, Bryan. English Electric/BAC Lightning. Wellingborough, UK: Patrick Stevens Ltd, 1984. .
 "Punter, H". "An Arabian Magic Carpet". Air International, Vol. 15, No. 5, October 1978, pp. 167–172.
 Ransom, Stephen and Robert Fairclough. English Electric Aircraft and their Predecessors. London: Putnam, 1987. .
 Scott, Stewart A. "English Electric Lightning, Volume One: Birth of the Legend." Peterborough, Cambridgeshire, UK: GMS Enterprises, 2000. .
 Williams, Anthony G. and Emmanuel Gustin. Flying Guns: The Modern Era. Wiltshire, UK: Crowood Press, 2004. .
 Winchester, Jim, ed. "English Electric Lightning." Military Aircraft of the Cold War (The Aviation Factfile). Rochester, Kent, UK: The Grange plc., 2006. .
 Wood, Derek. Project Cancelled: The Disaster of Britain's Abandoned Aircraft Projects 2nd ed. London: Janes, 1986. .

Further reading
 Caygill, Peter. Lightning from the Cockpit: Flying the Supersonic Legend. Barnsley, South Yorkshire, UK: Pen & Sword Books Ltd., 2004. .

External links

 Anglo American Lightning Organisation, returning to flight XS422, the former ETPS Lightning at Stennis Airport, Kiln, Mississippi
 The Lightning Association
 Thunder City
 Five-minute RAF Recruiting film "Streaked Lightning" from 1962 at the National Archives Public

Lightning
Mid-wing aircraft
Twinjets
1950s British fighter aircraft